In mathematics, SO(5), also denoted SO5(R) or SO(5,R), is the special orthogonal group of degree 5 over the field R of real numbers, i.e. (isomorphic to) the group of orthogonal 5×5 matrices of determinant 1.

Geometric interpretation

SO(5) is a subgroup of the direct Euclidean group E+(5), the group of direct isometries, i.e., isometries preserving orientation, of R5, consisting of elements which leave the origin fixed.

More precisely, we have:
SO(5)  E+(5) / T
where T is the translational group of R5.

Lie group

SO(5) is a simple Lie group of dimension 10.

See also

Orthogonal matrix
Orthogonal group
Rotation group SO(3)
List of simple Lie groups

Lie groups